Basketball Western Australia (a.k.a. the Western Australian Basketball Federation) is the governing body of basketball in Western Australia and is responsible for the development and promotion of the sport at a state and local level.

History

The Western Australian Basketball Federation (WABF) was founded in 1946 as the Western Australian Basketball Association, which later became known as the Amateur Basketball Association of Western Australia. The original Western Australian Basketball Association was formed by a small group of basketball enthusiasts at the Perth YMCA on Murray Street on Wednesday, 3 April 1946. The sport had already been played across the state for 35 years, but there had been no official management or promotion of the sport. John Leonard, a highly respected Perth businessman, athlete and two-time winner of football's coveted Sandover Medal, played a key role in orchestrating the first meeting on 3 April 1946. The initial aim was to form a body that would manage, control and promote the development of basketball in Western Australia. The resulting winter competition played at Claremont Showground saw teams compete for the John Leonard Perpetual Shield.

After the 1962 Commonwealth Games, the WABF's headquarters switched to the newly built Perry Lakes Basketball Stadium. The A Grade competition continued until 1972, when it was renamed the District Competition, involving seven association teams, although this was soon increased to eight. This format continued to 1987, although the competition underwent several name changes as sponsors began to show their interest. 1987 was something of a watershed year for the WABF, as the entire structure of the game in Western Australia was being reconsidered.

The impetus for the rethink was the dire financial straits which the WABF found itself in the previous year. The Perth Wildcats had been a financial burden since joining the National Basketball League (NBL) in 1982, and at the end of the 1986 season, the WABF was $400,000 in the red. A task force was established to sort out the mess, and the upshot was that Perth businessman Bob Williams, sponsor of the Wildcats in 1986, purchased a 60 percent interest in the team from the WABF for $200,000. The WABF's administration was also restructured, with Alan Marshall joining as chief executive with a brief to put the WABF on a firm financial footing.

A census in 1987 showed that 61 percent of WABF members were from country areas, so it was decided to try to include several country teams in the state's premier basketball league. However, this could not be done until the WABF had traded out its difficulties. Fortunately, the Wildcats had a hugely successful season in 1987—reaching the NBL Grand Final in their first trip to the finals—attracting much television coverage, which saw basketball's popularity soar.

An immediate result of the sport's new popularity was the debut of McDonald's as a sponsor. The fast-food chain entered into a $150,000 three-year deal with the WABF, sponsoring the premier competition and funding an extensive junior programme.

In 1988, it was decided to form a State Basketball League (SBL) for both men and women, and to develop it into an elite, statewide competition as soon as possible. This meant seeking out private owners and attracting corporate sponsorship, so as to not burden the association. As part of basketball's development, the Western Australian Institute of Sport men's team was included in the SBL under Warren Kuhn.

Simon Leunig, who had been the WABF's development officer, was appointed general manager of the SBL, and set about organising an expanded league for 1989. His marketing strategy paid off, and three new franchises were established in country areas: the Rainbow Coast Raiders from Albany were the first, followed by the Batavia Buccaneers from Geraldton and the Souwest Slammers from Bunbury.

The expanded SBL, which was limited to men's teams in 1989, was sponsored by McDonald's and Skywest, with a $65,000 grant from the State Government to help with travel costs.

Operations
Basketball WA's elite operations consists of the ownership of the Perth Lynx that play in the Women's National Basketball League (WNBL), as well as the management of the Perth Wheelcats and Western Stars, who play in the National Wheelchair Basketball League (NWBL) and the Women's National Wheelchair Basketball League (WNWBL) respectively.

Basketball WA's most prominent competitions are the NBL1 West and the Western Australian Basketball League (WABL). The NBL1 West comprises both a men's and women's semi-professional competition, while the WABL consists of multiple under-age junior divisions.

Since 2014, Basketball WA has been in charge of the day-to-day operations of the Bendat Basketball Centre under a co-management agreement with VenuesWest.

Major affiliated associations

References

External links

Basketball WA's official website

Basketball governing bodies in Australia
Basketball in Western Australia
Sports governing bodies in Western Australia
1946 establishments in Australia
Sports organizations established in 1946